No Reason to Cry is the fourth studio album by Eric Clapton, released by RSO Records on 27 August 1976. The album was recorded in Malibu and Los Angeles between December 1975 to May 1976. The record went platinum in the U.K.

Recording
The album was recorded at The Band's Shangri-la Studios in March 1976, and included involvement from all five members of The Band; Rick Danko shared vocals with Clapton on "All Our Past Times," which he co-wrote with Clapton. The album also includes a duet with Bob Dylan on his otherwise unreleased song "Sign Language." The booklet in Bob Dylan's box set The Bootleg Series Volumes 1–3 (Rare & Unreleased) 1961–1991 describes his involvement in this album: "Dylan dropped by and was just hanging out, living in a tent at the bottom of the garden. He would sneak into the studio to see what was going on. Dylan offered his new, unrecorded song "Seven Days" to Clapton. Clapton passed on it, but Ron Wood took him up on the offer and released it on his third solo album Gimme Some Neck". The song "Innocent Times" is sung by Marcy Levy, who also shared vocals with Clapton on "Hungry."

Chart performance
No Reason to Cry is one of Clapton's most internationally successful albums from the 1970s. The release reached the Top 30 in seven national music album charts, hitting Top 10 in United Kingdom (peaking at No. 8) and in the Netherlands, where it topped out No. 9. The album was certified platinum in the United Kingdom. In Norway and the United States, the album charted at No. 13 and No. 15 respectively, while in New Zealand and Sweden, it reached No. 18 and No. 24 respectively.

Critical reception

AllMusic critic William Ruhlmann awarded the release 3.5 of five possible stars, writing: "No Reason to Cry is identifiable as the kind of pop/rock Clapton had been making since the start of his solo career", adding "the most memorable music on the album occurs when Clapton is collaborating with members of the Band and other guests". Finishing his review, Ruhlmann called the release "a good purchase for fans of Bob Dylan and the Band, but not necessarily for those of Eric Clapton". Rolling Stone journalist Dave Marsh finds, the album recordings are "much more mélange than masterpiece". Robert Christgau rated the album with a "B−" and calls the album "a well-made, rather likable rock and roll LP", noting the "singing is eloquent and the instrumental signature an almost irresistible pleasure".

Track listings

Personnel 
The listed personnel was taken from the album's liner notes. The back cover also thanks additional people, who worked on the album, without specifying what their contribution was.

 Bob Dylan
 Ron Wood – guitar on "Beautiful Thing", "Sign Language", "County Jail Blues" and "All Our Past Times"
 Rick Danko 
 Richard Manuel 
 Robbie Robertson 
 Georgie Fame
 Ed Anderson
 Aggie
 Brains Bradley
 Jesse Ed Davis
 Terry Danko
 Bob Ellis
 Connie
 Konrad Kramer
 Yvonne Elliman
 Geoffrey Harrison
 Levon Helm 
 Garth Hudson 
 Marcy Levy
 Nello
 Jamie Oldaker
 Albhy Galuten
 Dick Simms
 Nat Jeffery
 Ralph Moss
 Dick La Palm
 Dread Lever
 Billy Preston
 Chris Jagger (vocals)
 Carl Radle
 Sergio Pastora Rodriguez
 Wilton Spears
 Dominic Lumetta
 Sandy Castle
 George Terry
 Rob Fraboni
 Larry Samuals
 Mick Turner
 Wah Wah Watson
 Pete & All at Shangri-La

Charts

Weekly charts

Year-end charts

Certifications

References

External links

1976 albums
Eric Clapton albums
RSO Records albums
The Band
Albums produced by Rob Fraboni
Albums recorded at Shangri-La (recording studio)